In ancient Greek religion and myth, Dionysus is the god of the grape-harvest, wine making, orchards and fruit, vegetation, fertility, festivity, insanity, ritual madness, religious ecstasy, and theatre. The Romans called him Bacchus ( or) for a frenzy he is said to induce called baccheia. As Dionysus Eleutherios ("the liberator"), his wine, music, and ecstatic dance free his followers from self-conscious fear and care, and subvert the oppressive restraints of the powerful. His thyrsus, a fennel-stem sceptre, sometimes wound with ivy and dripping with honey, is both a beneficent wand and a weapon used to destroy those who oppose his cult and the freedoms he represents. Those who partake of his mysteries are believed to become possessed and empowered by the god himself.

His origins are uncertain, and his cults took many forms; some are described by ancient sources as Thracian, others as Greek. In Orphic religion, he was variously a son of Zeus and Persephone; a chthonic or underworld aspect of Zeus; or the twice-born son of Zeus and the mortal Semele. The Eleusinian Mysteries identify him with Iacchus, the son or husband of Demeter. Most accounts say he was born in Thrace, traveled abroad, and arrived in Greece as a foreigner. His attribute of "foreignness" as an arriving outsider-god may be inherent and essential to his cults, as he is a god of epiphany, sometimes called "the god that comes".

Wine was a religious focus in the cult of Dionysus and was his earthly incarnation. Wine could ease suffering, bring joy, and inspire divine madness. Festivals of Dionysus included the performance of sacred dramas enacting his myths, the initial driving force behind the development of theatre in Western culture. The cult of Dionysus is also a "cult of the souls"; his maenads feed the dead through blood-offerings, and he acts as a divine communicant between the living and the dead. He is sometimes categorised as a dying-and-rising god.

Romans identified Bacchus with their own Liber Pater, the  "Free Father" of the Liberalia festival, patron of viniculture, wine and male fertility, and guardian of the traditions, rituals and freedoms attached to coming of age and citizenship, but the Roman state treated independent, popular festivals of Bacchus (Bacchanalia) as subversive, partly because their free mixing of classes and genders transgressed traditional social and moral constraints. Celebration of the Bacchanalia was made a capital offence, except in the toned-down forms and greatly diminished congregations approved and supervised by the State. Festivals of Bacchus were merged with those of Liber and Dionysus.

Name

Etymology

The dio- prefix in Ancient Greek  (Diónūsos; /di.ó.nyː.sos/) has been associated since antiquity with Zeus (genitive Dios), and the variants of the name seem to point to an original *Dios-nysos. The earliest attestation is the Mycenaean Greek dative form  (di-wo-nu-so), featured on two tablets that had been found at Mycenaean Pylos and dated to the twelfth or thirteenth century BC. At that time, there could be no certainty on whether this was indeed a theonym, but the 1989–90 Greek-Swedish Excavations at Kastelli Hill, Chania, unearthed, inter alia, four artefacts bearing Linear B inscriptions; among them, the inscription on item KH Gq 5 is thought to confirm Dionysus's early worship.
In Mycenaean Greek the form of Zeus is di-wo. The second element  is of unknown origin. It is perhaps associated with Mount Nysa, the birthplace of the god in Greek mythology, where he was nursed by nymphs (the Nysiads), although Pherecydes of Syros had postulated  as an archaic word for "tree" by the sixth century BC. On a vase of Sophilos the Nysiads are named . Jane Ellen Harrison believed that the name Dionysus means "young Zeus". Robert S. P. Beekes has suggested a Pre-Greek origin of the name, since all attempts to find an Indo-European etymology are doubtful.

Meaning and variants

A  prefix is found in other names, such as that of the Dioscures, and may derive from Dios, the genitive of the name of Zeus.

Nonnus, in his Dionysiaca, writes that the name Dionysus means "Zeus-limp" and that Hermes named the new born Dionysus this, "because Zeus while he carried his burden lifted one foot with a limp from the weight of his thigh, and nysos in Syracusan language means limping". In his note to these lines, W. H. D. Rouse writes "It need hardly be said that these etymologies are wrong". The Suda, a Byzantine encyclopedia based on classical sources, states that Dionysus was so named "from accomplishing [διανύειν] for each of those who live the wild life. Or from providing [διανοεῖν] everything for those who live the wild life."

Origins

Academics in the nineteenth century, using study of philology and comparative mythology, often regarded Dionysus as a foreign deity who was only reluctantly accepted into the standard Greek pantheon at a relatively late date, based on his myths which often involve this theme – a god who spends much of his time on earth abroad, and struggles for acceptance when he returns to Greece. However, more recent evidence has shown that Dionysus was in fact one of the earliest gods attested in mainland Greek culture. The earliest written records of Dionysus worship come from Mycenaean Greece, specifically in and around the Palace of Nestor in Pylos, dated to around 1300 BC. The details of any religion surrounding Dionysus in this period are scant, and most evidence comes in the form only of his name, written as di-wo-nu-su-jo ("Dionysoio" = 'of Dionysus') in Linear B, preserved on fragments of clay tablets that indicate a connection to offerings or payments of wine, which was described as being "of Dionysoio". References have also been uncovered to "women of Oinoa", the "place of wine", who may correspond to the Dionysian women of later periods.

Other Mycenaean records from Pylos record the worship of a god named Eleuther, who was the son of Zeus, and to whom oxen were sacrificed. The link to both Zeus and oxen, as well as etymological links between the name Eleuther or Eleutheros with the Latin name Liber Pater, indicates that this may have been another name for Dionysus. According to Károly Kerényi, these clues suggest that even in the thirteenth century BC, the core religion of Dionysus was in place, as were his important myths. At Knossos in Minoan Crete, men were often given the name "Pentheus", who is a figure in later Dionysian myth and which also means "suffering". Kerényi argued that to give such a name to one's child implies a strong religious connection, potentially not the separate character of Pentheus who suffers at the hands of Dionysus' followers in later myths, but as an epithet of Dionysus himself, whose mythology describes a god who must endure suffering before triumphing over it. According to Kerényi, the title of "man who suffers" likely originally referred to the god himself, only being applied to distinct characters as the myth developed.
The oldest known image of Dionysus, accompanied by his name, is found on a dinos by the Attic potter Sophilos around 570 BC and is located in the British Museum. By the seventh century, iconography found on pottery shows that Dionysus was already worshiped as more than just a god associated with wine. He was associated with weddings, death, sacrifice, and sexuality, and his retinue of satyrs and dancers was already established. A common theme in these early depictions was the metamorphosis, at the hand of the god, of his followers into hybrid creatures, usually represented by both tame and wild satyrs, representing the transition from civilized life back to nature as a means of escape.

Epithets

Dionysus was variably known with the following epithets:

Acratophorus, Ἀκρατοφόρος ("giver of unmixed wine"), at Phigaleia in Arcadia.

Acroreites at Sicyon.

Adoneus, a rare archaism in Roman literature, a Latinised form of Adonis, used as epithet for Bacchus.

Aegobolus Αἰγοβόλος ("goat-shooter") at Potniae, in Boeotia.

Aesymnetes Αἰσυμνήτης ("ruler" or "lord") at Aroë and Patrae in Achaea.

Agrios Ἄγριος ("wild"), in Macedonia.

Androgynos Ἀνδρόγυνος (androgynous, specifically in intercourse) referring to the god taking both an active male and a passive female role.

Anthroporraistes, Ἀνθρωπορραίστης  ("man-destroyer"), a title of Dionysus at Tenedos.

Bassareus, Βασσαρεύς a Thracian name for Dionysus, which derives from bassaris or "fox-skin", which item was worn by his cultists in their mysteries.

 Bougenes, Βουγενής or Βοηγενής ("borne by a cow"), in the Mysteries of Lerna.

 Braetes, Βραίτης ("related to beer") at Thrace.

Briseus Βρῑσεύς ("he who prevails") in Smyrna.

Bromios Βρόμιος ("roaring", as of the wind, primarily relating to the central death/resurrection element of the myth, but also the god's transformations into lion and bull, and the boisterousness of those who drink alcohol. Also cognate with the "roar of thunder", which refers to Dionysus' father, Zeus "the thunderer".)

Choiropsalas χοιροψάλας ("pig-plucker": Greek χοῖρος = "pig", also used as a slang term for the female genitalia). A reference to Dionysus's role as a fertility deity.

Chthonios Χθόνιος ("the subterranean")

Cistophorus Κιστοφόρος ("basket-bearer, ivy-bearer"), Alludes To baskets being sacred to the god.

Dimetor Διμήτωρ ("twice-born") Refers to Dionysus's two births.

Dendrites Δενδρίτης ("he of the trees"), as a fertility god.

Dithyrambos, Διθύραμβος used at his festivals, referring to his premature birth.

Eleutherios Ἐλευθέριος ("the liberator"), an epithet shared with Eros.

Endendros ("he in the tree").

Enorches ("with balls"), with reference to his fertility, or "in the testicles" in reference to Zeus' sewing the baby Dionysus "into his thigh", understood to mean his testicles). used in Samos and Lesbos.

Eridromos ("good-running"), in Nonnus' Dionysiaca.

Erikryptos Ἐρίκρυπτος ("completely hidden"), in Macedonia.

Euaster (Εὐαστήρ), from the cry "euae".

Euius (Euios), from the cry "euae" in lyric passages, and in Euripides' play, The Bacchae.

Iacchus, Ἴακχος a possible epithet of Dionysus, associated with the Eleusinian Mysteries. In Eleusis, he is known as a son of Zeus and Demeter. The name "Iacchus" may come from the Ιακχος (Iakchos), a hymn sung in honor of Dionysus.

Indoletes, Ἰνδολέτης, meaning slayer/killer of Indians. Due to his campaign against the Indians.

Isodaetes, Ισοδαίτης, meaning "he who distributes equal portions", cult epithet also shared with Helios.

Kemilius, Κεμήλιος (kemas: "young deer, pricket").

Liknites ("he of the winnowing fan"), as a fertility god connected with mystery religions. A winnowing fan was used to separate the chaff from the grain.

Lenaius,  Ληναῖος ("god of the wine-press") 

Lyaeus, or Lyaios (Λυαῖος, "deliverer", literally "loosener"), one who releases from care and anxiety.

Lysius, Λύσιος ("delivering, releasing"). At Thebes there was a temple of Dionysus Lysius.

Melanaigis Μελάναιγις ("of the black goatskin") at the Apaturia festival.

Morychus Μόρυχος ("smeared"); in Sicily, because his icon was smeared with wine lees at the vintage.

Mystes Μύστης ("of the mysteries") at Tegea in Arcadia.

Nysian Nύσιος, according to Philostratus, he was called like this by the ancient Indians. Most probably, because according to legend he founded the city of Nysa.

Oeneus, Οἰνεύς ("wine-dark") as god of the wine press.

Omadios ("flesh-eater"), Eusebius writes in Preparation for the Gospel that, Euelpis of Carystus states that, in Chios and Tenedos they did human sacrifice to Dionysus Omadios.

Phallen , (Φαλλήν) (probably "related to the phallus"), at Lesbos.

Phleus ("related to the bloοm of a plant").

Pseudanor Ψευδάνωρ (literally "false man", referring to his feminine qualities), in Macedonia.

Pericionius, Περικιόνιος ("climbing the column (ivy)", a name of Dionysus at Thebes.

Semeleios (Semeleius or Semeleus), an obscure epithet meaning 'He of the Earth', 'son of Semele'. Also appears in the expression Semeleios Iakchus plutodotas ("Son of Semele, Iakchus, wealth-giver").

Skyllitas, Σκυλλίτας ("related to the vine-branch") at Kos.

Sykites, Συκίτης ("related to figs"), at Laconia.

Taurophagus, Ταυροφάγος ("bull eating").

Tauros Ταῦρος ("a bull"), occurs as a surname of Dionysus.

Theoinus, Θέοινος (wine-god of a festival in Attica).

Τhyiοn, Θυίων ("from the festival of Dionysus 'Thyia' (Θυῐα) at Elis").

Thyllophorus, Θυλλοφόρος ("bearing leaves"), at Kos.

In the Greek pantheon, Dionysus (along with Zeus) absorbs the role of Sabazios, a Thracian/Phrygian deity. In the Roman pantheon, Sabazius became an alternative name for Bacchus.

Worship and festivals in Greece

Dionysus worship became firmly established by the seventh century BC. He may have been worshiped as early as c. 1500–1100 BC by Mycenaean Greeks; and traces of Dionysian-type cult have also been found in ancient Minoan Crete.

Dionysia

The Dionysia, Haloa, Ascolia and Lenaia festivals were dedicated to Dionysus. The Rural Dionysia (or Lesser Dionysia) was one of the oldest festivals dedicated to Dionysus, begun in Attica, and probably celebrated the cultivation of vines. It was held during the winter month of Poseideon (the time surrounding the winter solstice, modern December or January). The Rural Dionysia centered on a procession, during which participants carried phalluses, long loaves of bread, jars of water and wine as well as other offerings, and young girls carried baskets. The procession was followed by a series of dramatic performances and drama competitions.

The City Dionysia (or Greater Dionysia) took place in urban centers such as Athens and Eleusis, and was a later development, probably beginning during the sixth century BC. Held three months after the Rural Dionysia, the Greater festival fell near the spring equinox in the month of Elaphebolion (modern March or April). The procession of the City Dionysia was similar to that of the rural celebrations, but more elaborate, and led by participants carrying a wooden statue of Dionysus, and including sacrificial bulls and ornately dressed choruses. The dramatic competitions of the Greater Dionysia also featured more noteworthy poets and playwrights, and prizes for both dramatists and actors in multiple categories.

Anthesteria

The Anthesteria (Ἀνθεστήρια) was an Athenian festival that celebrated the beginning of spring. It spanned three days: Pithoigia (Πιθοίγια, "Jar-Opening"), Choes (Χοαί, "The Pouring") and Chythroi (Χύτροι "The Pots"). It was said the dead arose from the underworld during the span of the festival. Along with the souls of the dead, the Keres also wandered through the city and had to be banished when the festival ended. On the first day, Wine vats were opened. The wine was opened and mixed in honour of the god. The rooms and the drinking vessels were adorned with flowers along with children over three years of age.

On the second day, a solemn ritual for Dionysus occurred along with drinking. People dressed up, sometimes as members of Dionysus's entourage, and visited others. Choes was also the occasion of a solemn and secret ceremony. In one of the sanctuaries of Dionysus in the Lenaeum, which for the rest of the year was closed. The basilissa (or basilinna), wife of the basileus, underwent through a symbolic ceremonial marriage to the god, possibly representing a Hieros gamos. The basilissa was assisted by fourteen Athenian matrons (called Gerarai) who were chosen by the basileus and sworn to secrecy.

The last day was dedicated to the dead. Offerings were also offered to Hermes, due to his connection to the underworld. It was considered a day of merrymaking. Some poured Libations on the tombs of deceased relatives. Chythroi ended with a ritual cry intended to order the souls of the dead to return to the underworld. Keres were also banished from the festival on the last day.

To protect themselves from evil, people chewed leaves of whitethorn and smeared their doors with tar to protect themselves. The festival also allowed servants and slaves to join in on the festivities.

Bacchic Mysteries

The central religious cult of Dionysus is known as the Bacchic or Dionysian Mysteries. The exact origin of this religion is unknown, though Orpheus was said to have invented the mysteries of Dionysus. Evidence suggests that many sources and rituals typically considered to be part of the similar Orphic Mysteries actually belong to Dionysian mysteries. Some scholars have suggested that, additionally, there is no difference between the Dionysian mysteries and the mysteries of Persephone, but that these were all facets of the same mystery religion, and that Dionysus and Persephone both had important roles in it. Previously considered to have been a primarily rural and fringe part of Greek religion, the major urban center of Athens played a major role in the development and spread of the Bacchic mysteries.

The Bacchic mysteries served an important role in creating ritual traditions for transitions in people's lives; originally primarily for men and male sexuality, but later also created space for ritualizing women's changing roles and celebrating changes of status in a woman's life. This was often symbolized by a meeting with the gods who rule over death and change, such as Hades and Persephone, but also with Dionysus' mother Semele, who probably served a role related to initiation into the mysteries.

The religion of Dionysus often included rituals involving the sacrifice of goats or bulls, and at least some participants and dancers wore wooden masks associated with the god. In some instances, records show the god participating in the ritual via a masked and clothed pillar, pole, or tree is used, while his worshipers eat bread and drink wine. The significance of masks and goats to the worship of Dionysus seems to date back to the earliest days of his worship, and these symbols have been found together at a Minoan tomb near Phaistos in Crete.

Eleusinian Mysteries

As early as the fifth century BC, Dionysus became identified with Iacchus, a minor deity from the tradition of the Eleusinian Mysteries. This association may have arisen because of the homophony of the names Iacchus and Bacchus. Two black-figure lekythoi (c. 500 BC), possibly represent the earliest evidence for such an association. The nearly-identical vases, one in Berlin, the other in Rome, depict Dionysus, along with the inscription IAKXNE, a possible miswriting of IAKXE. More early evidence can be found in the works of the fifth-century BC Athenian tragedians Sophocles and Euripides. In Sophocles' Antigone (c. 441 BC), an ode to Dionysus begins by addressing Dionysus as the "God of many names" (πολυώνυμε), who rules over the glens of Demeter's Eleusis, and ends by identifying him with "Iacchus the Giver", who leads "the chorus of the stars whose breath is fire" and whose "attendant Thyiads" dance in "night-long frenzy". And in a fragment from a lost play, Sophocles describes Nysa, Dionysus' traditional place of nurture: "From here I caught sight of Nysa, haunt of Bacchus, famed among mortals, which Iacchus of the bull's horns counts as his beloved nurse". In Euripides' Bacchae (c. 405 BC), a messenger, describing the Bacchic revelries on mount Cithaeron, associates Iacchus with Bromius, another of the names of Dionysus, saying, they "began to wave the thyrsos ... calling on Iacchus, the son of Zeus, Bromius, with united voice."

An inscription found on a stone stele (c. 340 BC), found at Delphi, contains a paean to Dionysus, which describes his travels. From Thebes, where he was born, he first went to Delphi where he displayed his "starry body", and with "Delphian girls" took his "place on the folds of Parnassus", then next to Eleusis, where he is called "Iacchus":

And in your hand brandishing your night-
lighting flame, with god-possessed frenzy
you went to the vales of Eleusis
...
where the whole people of Hellas'
land, alongside your own native witnesses
of the holy mysteries, calls upon you
as Iacchus: for mortals from their pains
you have opened a haven without toils.

Strabo, says that Greeks "give the name 'Iacchus' not only to Dionysus but also to the leader-in-chief of the mysteries". In particular, Iacchus was identified with the Orphic Dionysus, who was a son of Persephone. Sophocles mentions "Iacchus of the bull's horns", and according to the first-century BC historian Diodorus Siculus, it was this older Dionysus who was represented in paintings and sculptures with horns, because he "excelled in sagacity and was the first to attempt the yoking of oxen and by their aid to effect the sowing of the seed". Arrian, the second-century Greek historian, wrote that it was to this Dionysus, the son of Zeus and Persephone, "not the Theban Dionysus, that the mystic chant 'Iacchus' is sung". The second-century poet Lucian also referred to the "dismemberment of Iacchus".

The fourth- or fifth-century poet Nonnus associated the name Iacchus with the "third" Dionysus. He described the Athenian celebrations given to the first Dionysus Zagreus, son of Persephone, the second Dionysus Bromios, son of Semele, and the third Dionysus Iacchus:
They [the Athenians] honoured him as a god next after the son of Persephone, and after Semele's son; they established sacrifices for Dionysos late born and Dionysos first born, and third they chanted a new hymn for Iacchos. In these three celebrations Athens held high revel; in the dance lately made, the Athenians beat the step in honour of Zagreus and Bromios and Iacchos all together.

By some accounts, Iacchus was the husband of Demeter. Several other sources identify Iacchus as Demeter's son. The earliest such source, a fourth-century BC vase fragment at Oxford, shows Demeter holding the child Dionysus on her lap. By the first-century BC, Demeter suckling Iacchus had become such a common motif, that the Latin poet Lucretius could use it as an apparently recognizable example of a lover's euphemism. A scholiast on the second-century AD Aristides, explicitly names Demeter as Iacchus' mother.

Orphism

In the Orphic tradition, the "first Dionysus" was the son of Zeus and Persephone, and was dismembered by the Titans before being reborn. Dionysus was the patron god of the Orphics, who they connected to death and immortality, and he symbolized the one who guides the process of reincarnation.

This Orphic Dionysus is sometimes referred to with the alternate name Zagreus. The earliest mentions of this name in literature describe him as a partner of Gaia and call him the highest god. Aeschylus linked Zagreus with Hades, as either Hades' son or Hades himself. Noting "Hades' identity as Zeus' katachthonios alter ego", Timothy Gantz thought it likely that Zagreus, originally, perhaps, the son of Hades and Persephone, later merged with the Orphic Dionysus, the son of Zeus and Persephone. However, no known Orphic sources use the name "Zagreus" to refer to the Orphic Dionysus. It is possible that the association between the two was known by the third century BC, when the poet Callimachus may have written about it in a now-lost source. Callimachus, as well as his contemporary Euphorion, told the story of the dismemberment of the infant Dionysus, and Byzantine sources quote Callimachus as referring to the birth of a "Dionysos Zagreus", explaining that Zagreus was the poets' name for the chthonic aspect of Dionysus. The earliest definitive reference to the belief that Zagreus is another name for the Orphic Dionysus is found in the late first century writings of Plutarch. The fifth century Greek poet Nonnus' Dionysiaca tells the story of this Orphic Dionysus, in which Nonnus calls him the "older Dionysos ... illfated Zagreus", "Zagreus the horned baby", "Zagreus, the first Dionysos", "Zagreus the ancient Dionysos", and "Dionysos Zagreus".

Worship and festivals in Rome

Liber and importation to Rome

The mystery cult of Bacchus was brought to Rome from the Greek culture of southern Italy or by way of Greek-influenced Etruria. It was established around 200 BC in the Aventine grove of Stimula by a priestess from Campania, near the temple where Liber Pater ("the Free Father") had a State-sanctioned, popular cult. Liber was a native Roman god of wine, fertility, and prophecy, patron of Rome's plebeians (citizen-commoners), and one of the members of the Aventine Triad, along with his mother Ceres and sister or consort Libera. A temple to the Triad was erected on the Aventine Hill in 493 BC, along with the institution of celebrating the festival of Liberalia. The worship of the Triad gradually took on more and more Greek influence, and by 205 BC, Liber and Libera had been formally identified with Bacchus and Proserpina. Liber was often interchangeably identified with Dionysus and his mythology, though this identification was not universally accepted. Cicero insisted on the "non-identity of Liber and Dionysus" and described Liber and Libera as children of Ceres.

Liber, like his Aventine companions, carried various aspects of his older cults into official Roman religion. He protected various aspects of agriculture and fertility, including the vine and the "soft seed" of its grapes, wine and wine vessels, and male fertility and virility. Pliny called Liber "the first to establish the practice of buying and selling; he also invented the diadem, the emblem of royalty, and the triumphal procession." Roman mosaics and sarcophagi attest to various representations of a Dionysus-like exotic triumphal procession. In Roman and Greek literary sources from the late Republic and Imperial era, several notable triumphs feature similar, distinctively "Bacchic" processional elements, recalling the supposedly historic "Triumph of Liber".

Liber and Dionysus may have had a connection that predated Classical Greece and Rome, in the form of the Mycenaean god Eleutheros, who shared the lineage and iconography of Dionysus but whose name has the same meaning as Liber. Before the importation of the Greek cults, Liber was already strongly associated with Bacchic symbols and values, including wine and uninhibited freedom, as well as the subversion of the powerful. Several depictions from the late Republic era feature processions, depicting the "Triumph of Liber".

Bacchanalia

In Rome, the most well-known festivals of Bacchus were the Bacchanalia, based on the earlier Greek Dionysia festivals. These Bacchic rituals were said to have included omophagic practices, such as pulling live animals apart and eating the whole of them raw. This practice served not only as a reenactment of the infant death and rebirth of Bacchus, but also as a means by which Bacchic practitioners produced "enthusiasm": etymologically, to let a god enter the practitioner's body or to have her become one with Bacchus.

In Livy's account, the Bacchic mysteries were a novelty at Rome; originally restricted to women and held only three times a year, they were corrupted by an Etruscan-Greek version, and thereafter drunken, disinhibited men and women of all ages and social classes cavorted in a sexual free-for-all five times a month. Livy relates their various outrages against Rome's civil and religious laws and traditional morality (mos maiorum); a secretive, subversive and potentially revolutionary counter-culture. Livy's sources, and his own account of the cult, probably drew heavily on the Roman dramatic genre known as "Satyr plays", based on Greek originals. The cult was suppressed by the State with great ferocity; of the 7,000 arrested, most were executed. Modern scholarship treats much of Livy's account with skepticism; more certainly, a Senatorial edict, the Senatus consultum de Bacchanalibus was distributed throughout Roman and allied Italy. It banned the former Bacchic cult organisations. Each meeting must seek prior senatorial approval through a praetor. No more than three women and two men were allowed at any one meeting, and those who defied the edict risked the death penalty.

Bacchus was conscripted into the official Roman pantheon as an aspect of Liber, and his festival was inserted into the Liberalia. In Roman culture, Liber, Bacchus and Dionysus became virtually interchangeable equivalents. Thanks to his mythology involving travels and struggles on earth, Bacchus became euhemerised as a historical hero, conqueror, and founder of cities. He was a patron deity and founding hero at Leptis Magna, birthplace of the emperor Septimius Severus, who promoted his cult. In some Roman sources, the ritual procession of Bacchus in a tiger-drawn chariot, surrounded by maenads, satyrs and drunks, commemorates the god's triumphant return from the conquest of India. Pliny believed this to be the historical prototype for the Roman Triumph.

Post-classical worship

Late Antiquity

In the Neoplatonist philosophy and religion of Late Antiquity, the Olympian gods were sometimes considered to number 12 based on their spheres of influence. For example, according to Sallustius, "Jupiter, Neptune, and Vulcan fabricate the world; Ceres, Juno, and Diana animate it; Mercury, Venus, and Apollo harmonize it; and, lastly, Vesta, Minerva, and Mars preside over it with a guarding power." The multitude of other gods, in this belief system, subsist within the primary gods, and Sallustius taught that Bacchus subsisted in Jupiter.

In the Orphic tradition, a saying was supposedly given by an oracle of Apollo that stated "Zeus, Hades, [and] Helios-Dionysus" were "three gods in one godhead". This statement apparently conflated Dionysus not only with Hades, but also his father Zeus, and implied a particularly close identification with the sun-god Helios. When quoting this in his Hymn to King Helios, Emperor Julian substituted Dionysus' name with that of Serapis, whose Egyptian counterpart Osiris was also identified with Dionysus.

Worship from the Middle Ages to the Modern period

Three centuries after the reign of Theodosius I which saw the outlawing of pagan worship across the Roman Empire, the 692 Quinisext Council in Constantinople felt it necessary to warn Christians against participating in persisting rural worship of Dionysus. The council decried the Bacchic rites of the feast day Brumalia, "the public dances of women", ritual cross-dressing, the wearing of Dionysiac masks, and the invoking of Bacchus' name when "squeez[ing] out the wine in the presses" or "when pouring out wine into jars".

According to the Lanercost chronicle, during Easter in 1282 in Scotland, the parish priest of Inverkeithing led young women in a dance in honor of Priapus and Father Liber, commonly identified with Dionysus. The priest danced and sang at the front, carrying a representation of the phallus on a pole. He was killed by a Christian mob later that year. Historian C. S. Watkins believes that Richard of Durham, the author of the chronicle, identified an occurrence of apotropaic magic with his knowledge of ancient Greek religion, rather than recording an actual case of survival of pagan rituals.

The late medieval Byzantine scholar Gemistus Pletho secretly advocated in favor of a return to paganism in medieval Greece.

In the eighteenth century, Hellfire Clubs appeared in Britain and Ireland. Though activities varied between the clubs, some of them were very pagan, and included shrines and sacrifices. Dionysus was one of the most popular deities, alongside deities like Venus and Flora. Today one can still see the statue of Dionysus left behind in the Hellfire Caves.

In 1820, Ephraim Lyon founded the Church of Bacchus in Eastford, Connecticut. He declared himself High Priest, and added local drunks to the list of membership. He maintained that those who died as members would go to a Bacchanalia for their afterlife.

Modern pagan and polytheist groups often include worship of Dionysus in their traditions and practices, most prominently groups which have sought to revive Hellenic polytheism, such as the Supreme Council of Ethnic Hellenes (YSEE). In addition to libations of wine, modern worshipers of Dionysus offer the god grape vines, ivy, and various forms of incense, particularly styrax. They may also celebrate Roman festivals such as the Liberalia (March 17, close to the Spring Equinox) or Bacchanalia (Various dates), and various Greek festivals such as the Anthesteria, Lenaia, and the Greater and Lesser Dionysias, the dates of which are calculated by the lunar calendar.

Identification with other gods

Osiris

In the Greek interpretation of the Egyptian pantheon, Dionysus was often identified with Osiris. Stories of the dismemberment of Osiris and the re-assembly and resurrection by Isis closely parallel those of the Orphic Dionysus and Demeter. According to Diodorus Siculus, as early as the fifth century BC, the two gods had been syncretized as a single deity known as Dionysus-Osiris. The most notable record of this belief is found in Herodotus' 'Histories'. Plutarch also described his belief that Osiris and Dionysus were identical, stating that anyone familiar with the secret rituals associated with both gods would recognize obvious parallels, and that their dismemberment myths and associated public symbols are enough additional evidence that they are the same god worshiped by two different cultures.

Other syncretic Greco-Egyptian deities arose out of this conflation, including with the gods Serapis and Hermanubis. Serapis was believed to be both Hades and Osiris, and the Roman Emperor Julian considered him the same as Dionysus as well. Dionysus-Osiris was particularly popular in Ptolemaic Egypt, as the Ptolemies claimed descent from Dionysus, and as Pharaohs they had claim to the lineage of Osiris. This association was most notable during a deification ceremony where Mark Antony became Dionysus-Osiris, alongside Cleopatra as Isis-Aphrodite.

Egyptian myths about Priapus said that the Titans conspired against Osiris, killed him, divided his body into equal parts, and "slipped them secretly out of the house". All but Osiris' penis, which since none of them "was willing to take it with him", they threw into the river. Isis, Osiris' wife, hunted down and killed the Titans, reassembled Osiris' body parts "into the shape of a human figure", and gave them "to the priests with orders that they pay Osiris the honours of a god". But since she was unable to recover the penis she ordered the priests "to pay to it the honours of a god and to set it up in their temples in an erect position."

Hades

The fifth–fourth century BC philosopher Heraclitus, unifying opposites, declared that Hades and Dionysus, the very essence of indestructible life (zoë), are the same god. Among other evidence, Karl Kerényi notes in his book that the Homeric Hymn "To Demeter", votive marble images and epithets all link Hades to being Dionysus. He also notes that the grieving goddess Demeter refused to drink wine, as she states that it would be against themis for her to drink wine, which is the gift of Dionysus, after Persephone's abduction, because of this association; indicating that Hades may in fact have been a "cover name" for the underworld Dionysus. He suggests that this dual identity may have been familiar to those who came into contact with the Mysteries. One of the epithets of Dionysus was "Chthonios", meaning "the subterranean".

Evidence for a cult connection is quite extensive, particularly in southern Italy, especially when considering the heavy involvement of death symbolism included in Dionysian worship; statues of Dionysus found in the Ploutonion at Eleusis gives further evidence as the statues found bear a striking resemblance to the statue of Eubouleus, also called Aides Kyanochaites (Hades of the flowing dark hair), known as the youthful depiction of the Lord of the Underworld. The statue of Eubouleus is described as being radiant but disclosing a strange inner darkness Ancient portrayals show Dionysus holding in his hand the kantharos, a wine-jar with large handles, and occupying the place where one would expect to see Hades. Archaic artist Xenocles portrayed on one side of a vase, Zeus, Poseidon and Hades, each with his emblems of power; with Hades' head turned back to front and, on the other side, Dionysus striding forward to meet his bride Persephone, with the kantharos in his hand, against a background of grapes. Dionysus also shared several epithets with Hades such as Chthonios, Eubouleus and Euclius.

Both Hades and Dionysus were associated with a divine tripartite deity with Zeus. Zeus, like Dionysus, was occasionally believed to have an underworld form, closely identified with Hades, to the point that they were occasionally thought of as the same god.

According to Marguerite Rigoglioso, Hades is Dionysus, and this dual god was believed by the Eleusinian tradition to have impregnated Persephone. This would bring the Eleusinian in harmony with the myth in which Zeus, not Hades, impregnated Persephone to bear the first Dionysus. Rigoglioso argues that taken together, these myths suggest a belief that is that, with Persephone, Zeus/Hades/Dionysus created (in terms quoted from Kerényi) "a second, a little Dionysus", who is also a "subterranean Zeus". The unification of Hades, Zeus, and Dionysus as a single tripartite god was used to represent the birth, death and resurrection of a deity and to unify the 'shining' realm of Zeus and the dark underworld realm of Hades. According to Rosemarie Taylor-Perry,it is often mentioned that Zeus, Hades and Dionysus were all attributed to being the exact same god... Being a tripartite deity Hades is also Zeus, doubling as being the Sky God or Zeus, Hades abducts his 'daughter' and paramour Persephone. The taking of Kore by Hades is the act which allows the conception and birth of a second integrating force: Iacchos (Zagreus-Dionysus), also known as Liknites, the helpless infant form of that Deity who is the unifier of the dark underworld (chthonic) realm of Hades and the Olympian ("Shining") one of Zeus.

Sabazios and Yahweh

The Phrygian god Sabazios was alternately identified with Zeus or with Dionysus. The Byzantine Greek encyclopedia, Suda (c. tenth century), stated: Sabazios ... is the same as Dionysos. He acquired this form of address from the rite pertaining to him; for the barbarians call the bacchic cry "sabazein". Hence some of the Greeks too follow suit and call the cry "sabasmos"; thereby Dionysos [becomes] Sabazios. They also used to call "saboi" those places that had been dedicated to him and his Bacchantes ... Demosthenes [in the speech] "On Behalf of Ktesiphon" [mentions them]. Some say that Saboi is the term for those who are dedicated to Sabazios, that is to Dionysos, just as those [dedicated] to Bakkhos [are] Bakkhoi. They say that Sabazios and Dionysos are the same. Thus some also say that the Greeks call the Bakkhoi Saboi.

Strabo, in the first century, linked Sabazios with Zagreus among Phrygian ministers and attendants of the sacred rites of Rhea and Dionysos. Strabo's Sicilian contemporary, Diodorus Siculus, conflated Sabazios with the secret Dionysus, born of Zeus and Persephone, However, this connection is not supported by any surviving inscriptions, which are entirely to Zeus Sabazios.

Several ancient sources record an apparently widespread belief in the classical world that the god worshiped by the Jewish people, Yahweh, was identifiable as Dionysus or Liber via his identification with Sabazios. Tacitus, Lydus, Cornelius Labeo, and Plutarch all either made this association, or discussed it as an extant belief (though some, like Tacitus, specifically brought it up in order to reject it). According to Plutarch, one of the reasons for the identification is that Jews were reported to hail their god with the words "Euoe" and "Sabi", a cry typically associated with the worship of Sabazius. According to scholar Sean M. McDonough, it is possible that Plutarch's sources had confused the cry of "Iao Sabaoth" (typically used by Greek speakers in reference to Yahweh) with the Sabazian cry of "Euoe Saboe", originating the confusion and conflation of the two deities. The cry of "Sabi" could also have been conflated with the Jewish term "sabbath", adding to the evidence the ancients saw that Yahweh and Dionysus/Sabazius were the same deity. Further bolstering this connection would have been coins used by the Maccabees that included imagery linked to the worship of Dionysus such as grapes, vine leaves, and cups. However the belief that the Jewish god was identical with Dionysus/Sabazius was widespread enough that a coin dated to 55 BC depicting a kneeling king was labelled "Bacchus Judaeus" (BACCHIVS IVDAEVS), and in 139 BC praetor Cornelius Scipio Hispalus deported Jewish people for attempting to "infect the Roman customs with the cult of Jupiter Sabazius".

Mythology

Various different accounts and traditions existed in the ancient world regarding the parentage, birth, and life of Dionysus on earth, complicated by his several rebirths. By the first century BC, some mythographers had attempted to harmonize the various accounts of Dionysus' birth into a single narrative involving not only multiple births, but two or three distinct manifestations of the god on earth throughout history in different lifetimes. The historian Diodorus Siculus said that according to "some writers of myths" there were two gods named Dionysus, an older one, who was the son of Zeus and Persephone, but that the "younger one also inherited the deeds of the older, and so the men of later times, being unaware of the truth and being deceived because of the identity of their names thought there had been but one Dionysus." He also said that Dionysus "was thought to have two forms...the ancient one having a long beard, because all men in early times wore long beards, the younger one being youthful and effeminate and young."

Though the varying genealogy of Dionysus was mentioned in many works of classical literature, only a few contain the actual narrative myths surrounding the events of his multiple births. These include the first century BC Bibliotheca historica by Greek historian Diodorus, which describes the birth and deeds of the three incarnations of Dionysus; the brief birth narrative given by the first century AD Roman author Hyginus, which describes a double birth for Dionysus; and a longer account in the form of Greek poet Nonnus's epic Dionysiaca, which discusses three incarnations of Dionysus similar to Diodorus' account, but which focuses on the life of the third Dionysus, born to Zeus and Semele.

First birth
Though Diodorus mentions some traditions which state an older, Indian or Egyptian Dionysus existed who invented wine, no narratives are given of his birth or life among mortals, and most traditions ascribe the invention of wine and travels through India to the last Dionysus. According to Diodorus, Dionysus was originally the son of Zeus and Persephone (or alternately, Zeus and Demeter). This is the same horned Dionysus described by Hyginus and Nonnus in later accounts, and the Dionysus worshiped by the Orphics, who was dismembered by the Titans and then reborn. Nonnus calls this Dionysus Zagreus, while Diodorus says he is also considered identical with Sabazius. However, unlike Hyginus and Nonnus, Diodorus does not provide a birth narrative for this incarnation of the god. It was this Dionysus who was said to have taught mortals how to use oxen to plow the fields, rather than doing so by hand. His worshipers were said to have honored him for this by depicting him with horns.

The Greek poet Nonnus gives a birth narrative for Dionysus in his late fourth or early fifth century AD epic Dionysiaca. In it, he described how Zeus "intended to make a new Dionysos grow up, a bullshaped copy of the older Dionysos" who was the Egyptian god Osiris. (Dionysiaca 4) Zeus took the shape of a serpent ("drakon"), and "ravished the maidenhood of unwedded Persephoneia." According to Nonnus, though Persephone was "the consort of the blackrobed king of the underworld", she remained a virgin, and had been hidden in a cave by her mother to avoid the many gods who were her suitors, because "all that dwelt in Olympos were bewitched by this one girl, rivals in love for the marriageable maid." (Dionysiaca 5) After her union with Zeus, Persephone's womb "swelled with living fruit", and she gave birth to a horned baby, named Zagreus. Zagreus, despite his infancy, was able to climb onto the throne of Zeus and brandish his lightning bolts, marking him as Zeus' heir. Hera saw this and alerted the Titans, who smeared their faces with chalk and ambushed the infant Zagreus "while he contemplated his changeling countenance reflected in a mirror." They attacked him. However, according to Nonnus, "where his limbs had been cut piecemeal by the Titan steel, the end of his life was the beginning of a new life as Dionysos." He began to change into many different forms in which he returned the attack, including Zeus, Cronus, a baby, and "a mad youth with the flower of the first down marking his rounded chin with black." He then transformed into several animals to attack the assembled Titans, including a lion, a wild horse, a horned serpent, a tiger, and, finally, a bull. Hera intervened, killing the bull with a shout, and the Titans finally slaughtered him and cut him into pieces. Zeus attacked the Titans and had them imprisoned in Tartaros. This caused the mother of the Titans, Gaia, to suffer, and her symptoms were seen across the whole world, resulting in fires and floods, and boiling seas. Zeus took pity on her, and in order to cool down the burning land, he caused great rains to flood the world. (Dionysiaca 6)

Interpretation

In the Orphic tradition, Dionysus was, in part, a god associated with the underworld. As a result, the Orphics considered him the son of Persephone, and believed that he had been dismembered by the Titans and then reborn. The myth of the dismemberment of Dionysus was alluded to as early as the fourth century BC by Plato in his Phaedo, in which Socrates claims that the initiations of the Dionysian Mysteries are similar to those of the philosophic path. Late Neoplatonists such as Damascius explored the implications of this at length. The dismemberment of Dionysus (the sparagmos) is often considered to be the most important myth of Orphism.

Many modern sources identify this "Orphic Dionysus" with the god Zagreus, though this name does not seem to have been used by any of the ancient Orphics, who simply called him Dionysus. As pieced together from various ancient sources, the reconstructed story, usually given by modern scholars, goes as follows. Zeus had intercourse with Persephone in the form of a serpent, producing Dionysus. The infant was taken to Mount Ida, where, like the infant Zeus, he was guarded by the dancing Curetes. Zeus intended Dionysus to be his successor as ruler of the cosmos, but a jealous Hera incited the Titans to kill the child. Damascius claims that he was mocked by the Titans, who gave him a fennel stalk (thyrsus) in place of his rightful scepter.

Diodorus relates that Dionysus is the son of Zeus and Demeter, the goddess of agriculture, and that his birth narrative is an allegory for the generative power of the gods at work in nature. When the "Sons of Gaia" (i.e. the Titans) boiled Dionysus following his birth, Demeter gathered together his remains, allowing his rebirth. Diodorus noted the symbolism this myth held for its adherents: Dionysus, god of the vine, was born from the gods of the rain and the earth. He was torn apart and boiled by the sons of Gaia, or "earth born", symbolizing the harvesting and wine-making process. Just as the remains of the bare vines are returned to the earth to restore its fruitfulness, the remains of the young Dionysus were returned to Demeter allowing him to be born again.

Second birth

The birth narrative given by Gaius Julius Hyginus (c. 64 BC – 17 AD) in Fabulae 167, agrees with the Orphic tradition that Liber (Dionysus) was originally the son of Jove (Zeus) and Proserpine (Persephone). Hyginus writes that Liber was torn apart by the Titans, so Jove took the fragments of his heart and put them into a drink which he gave to Semele, the daughter of Harmonia and Cadmus, king and founder of Thebes. This resulted in Semele becoming pregnant. Juno appeared to Semele in the form of her nurse, Beroe, and told her: "Daughter, ask Jove to come to you as he comes to Juno, so you may know what pleasure it is to sleep with a god." When Semele requested that Jove do so, she was killed by a thunderbolt. Jove then took the infant Liber from her womb, and put him in the care of Nysus. Hyginus states that "for this reason he is called Dionysus, and also the one with two mothers" (dimētōr).

Nonnus describes how, when life was rejuvenated after the flood, it was lacking in revelry in the absence of Dionysus. "The Seasons, those daughters of the lichtgang, still joyless, plaited garlands for the gods only of meadow-grass. For Wine was lacking. Without Bacchos to inspire the dance, its grace was only half complete and quite without profit; it charmed only the eyes of the company, when the circling dancer moved in twists and turns with a tumult of footsteps, having only nods for words, hand for mouth, fingers for voice." Zeus declared that he would send his son Dionysus to teach mortals how to grow grapes and make wine, to alleviate their toil, war, and suffering. After he became protector of humanity, Zeus promises, Dionysus would struggle on earth, but be received "by the bright upper air to shine beside Zeus and to share the courses of the stars." (Dionysiaca 7).

The mortal princess Semele then had a dream, in which Zeus destroyed a fruit tree with a bolt of lightning, but did not harm the fruit. He sent a bird to bring him one of the fruits, and sewed it into his thigh, so that he would be both mother and father to the new Dionysus. She saw the bull-shaped figure of a man emerge from his thigh, and then came to the realization that she herself had been the tree. Her father Cadmus, fearful of the prophetic dream, instructed Semele to make sacrifices to Zeus. Zeus came to Semele in her bed, adorned with various symbols of Dionysus. He transformed into a snake, and "Zeus made long wooing, and shouted "Euoi!" as if the winepress were near, as he begat his son who would love the cry." Immediately, Semele's bed and chambers were overgrown with vines and flowers, and the earth laughed. Zeus then spoke to Semele, revealing his true identity, and telling her to be happy: "you bring forth a son who shall not die, and you I will call immortal. Happy woman! you have conceived a son who will make mortals forget their troubles, you shall bring forth joy for gods and men." (Dionysiaca 7).

During her pregnancy, Semele rejoiced in the knowledge that her son would be divine. She dressed herself in garlands of flowers and wreathes of ivy, and would run barefoot to the meadows and forests to frolic whenever she heard music. Hera became envious, and feared that Zeus would replace her with Semele as queen of Olympus. She went to Semele in the guise of an old woman who had been Cadmus' wet nurse. She made Semele jealous of the attention Zeus gave to Hera, compared with their own brief liaison, and provoked her to request Zeus to appear before her in his full godhood. Semele prayed to Zeus that he show himself. Zeus answered her prayers, but warned her than no other mortals had ever seen him as he held his lightning bolts. Semele reached out to touch them, and was burnt to ash. (Dionysiaca 8). But the infant Dionysus survived, and Zeus rescued him from the flames, sewing him into his thigh. "So the rounded thigh in labour became female, and the boy too soon born was brought forth, but not in a mother's way, having passed from a mother's womb to a father's." (Dionysiaca 9). At his birth, he had a pair of horns shaped like a crescent moon. The Seasons crowned him with ivy and flowers, and wrapped horned snakes around his own horns.

An alternate birth narrative is given by Diodorus from the Egyptian tradition. In it, Dionysus is the son of Ammon, who Diodorus regards both as the creator god and a quasi-historical king of Libya. Ammon had married the goddess Rhea, but he had an affair with Amaltheia, who bore Dionysus. Ammon feared Rhea's wrath if she were to discover the child, so he took the infant Dionysus to Nysa (Dionysus' traditional childhood home). Ammon brought Dionysus into a cave where he was to be cared for by Nysa, a daughter of the hero Aristaeus. Dionysus grew famous due to his skill in the arts, his beauty, and his strength. It was said that he discovered the art of winemaking during his boyhood. His fame brought him to the attention of Rhea, who was furious with Ammon for his deception. She attempted to bring Dionysus under her own power but, unable to do so, she left Ammon and married Cronus.

Interpretation

Even in antiquity, the account of Dionysus' birth to a mortal woman led some to argue that he had been a historical figure who became deified over time, a suggestion of Euhemerism (an explanation of mythic events having roots in mortal history) often applied to demi-gods. The fourth century Roman emperor and philosopher Julian encountered examples of this belief, and wrote arguments against it. In his letter To the Cynic Heracleios, Julian wrote "I have heard many people say that Dionysus was a mortal man because he was born of Semele, and that he became a god through his knowledge of theurgy and the Mysteries, and like our lord Heracles for his royal virtue was translated to Olympus by his father Zeus." However, to Julian, the myth of Dionysus's birth (and that of Heracles) stood as an allegory for a deeper spiritual truth. The birth of Dionysus, Julian argues, was "no birth but a divine manifestation" to Semele, who foresaw that a physical manifestation of the god Dionysus would soon appear. However, Semele was impatient for the god to come, and began revealing his mysteries too early; for her transgression, she was struck down by Zeus. When Zeus decided it was time to impose a new order on humanity, for it to "pass from the nomadic to a more civilized mode of life", he sent his son Dionysus from India as a god made visible, spreading his worship and giving the vine as a symbol of his manifestation among mortals. In Julian's interpretation, the Greeks "called Semele the mother of Dionysus because of the prediction that she had made, but also because the god honored her as having been the first prophetess of his advent while it was yet to be." The allegorical myth of the birth of Dionysus, per Julian, was developed to express both the history of these events and encapsulate the truth of his birth outside the generative processes of the mortal world, but entering into it, though his true birth was directly from Zeus along into the intelligible realm.

Infancy

According to Nonnus, Zeus gave the infant Dionysus to the care of Hermes. Hermes gave Dionysus to the Lamides, or daughters of Lamos, who were river nymphs. But Hera drove the Lamides mad, and caused them to attack Dionysus, who was rescued by Hermes. Hermes next brought the infant to Ino for fostering by her attendant Mystis, who taught him the rites of the mysteries (Dionysiaca 9). In Apollodorus' account, Hermes instructed Ino to raise Dionysus as a girl, in order to hide him from Hera's wrath. However, Hera found him, and vowed to destroy the house with a flood; however, Hermes again rescued Dionysus, this time bringing him to the mountains of Lydia. Hermes adopted the form of Phanes, most ancient of the gods, and so Hera bowed before him and let him pass. Hermes gave the infant to the goddess Rhea, who cared for him through his adolescence.

Another version is that Dionysus was taken to the rain-nymphs of Nysa, who nourished his infancy and childhood, and for their care Zeus rewarded them by placing them as the Hyades among the stars (see Hyades star cluster). In yet another version of the myth, he is raised by his cousin Macris on the island of Euboea.

Dionysus in Greek mythology is a god of foreign origin, and while Mount Nysa is a mythological location, it is invariably set far away to the east or to the south. The Homeric Hymn 1 to Dionysus places it "far from Phoenicia, near to the Egyptian stream". Others placed it in Anatolia, or in Libya ("away in the west beside a great ocean"), in Ethiopia (Herodotus), or Arabia (Diodorus Siculus).
According to Herodotus:

The Bibliotheca seems to be following Pherecydes, who relates how the infant Dionysus, god of the grapevine, was nursed by the rain-nymphs, the Hyades at Nysa. Young Dionysus was also said to have been one of the many famous pupils of the centaur Chiron. According to Ptolemy Chennus in the Library of Photius, "Dionysus was loved by Chiron, from whom he learned chants and dances, the bacchic rites and initiations."

Travels and invention of wine

When Dionysus grew up, he discovered the culture of the vine and the mode of extracting its precious juice, being the first to do so; but Hera struck him with madness, and drove him forth a wanderer through various parts of the earth. In Phrygia the goddess Cybele, better known to the Greeks as Rhea, cured him and taught him her religious rites, and he set out on a progress through Asia teaching the people the cultivation of the vine. The most famous part of his wanderings is his expedition to India, which is said to have lasted several years. According to a legend, when Alexander the Great reached a city called Nysa near the Indus river, the locals said that their city was founded by Dionysus in the distant past and their city was dedicated to the god Dionysus. These travels took something of the form of military conquests; according to Diodorus Siculus he conquered the whole world except for Britain and Ethiopia.

Another myth according to Nonnus involves Ampelus, a satyr, who was loved by Dionysus. As related by Ovid, Ampelus became the constellation Vindemitor, or the "grape-gatherer": ...not so will the Grape-gatherer escape thee. The origin of that constellation also can be briefly told. 'Tis said that the unshorn Ampelus, son of a nymph and a satyr, was loved by Bacchus on the Ismarian hills. Upon him the god bestowed a vine that trailed from an elm's leafy boughs, and still the vine takes from the boy its name. While he rashly culled the gaudy grapes upon a branch, he tumbled down; Liber bore the lost youth to the stars." Another story of Ampelus was related by Nonnus: in an accident foreseen by Dionysus, the youth was killed while riding a bull maddened by the sting of a gadfly sent by Selene, the goddess of the Moon. The Fates granted Ampelus a second life as a vine, from which Dionysus squeezed the first wine.

Return to Greece

Returning in triumph to Greece after his travels in Asia, Dionysus came to be considered the founder of the triumphal procession. He undertook efforts to introduce his religion into Greece, but was opposed by rulers who feared it, on account of the disorders and madness it brought with it.

In one myth, adapted in Euripides' play The Bacchae, Dionysus returns to his birthplace, Thebes, which is ruled by his cousin Pentheus. Pentheus, as well as his mother Agave and his aunts Ino and Autonoe, disbelieve Dionysus' divine birth. Despite the warnings of the blind prophet Tiresias, they deny his worship and denounce him for inspiring the women of Thebes to madness.

Dionysus uses his divine powers to drive Pentheus insane, then invites him to spy on the ecstatic rituals of the Maenads, in the woods of Mount Cithaeron. Pentheus, hoping to witness a sexual orgy, hides himself in a tree. The Maenads spot him; maddened by Dionysus, they take him to be a mountain-dwelling lion, and attack him with their bare hands. Pentheus' aunts and his mother Agave are among them, and they rip him limb from limb. Agave mounts his head on a pike, and takes the trophy to her father Cadmus.

Euripides' description of this sparagmos was as follows:

“But she was foaming at the mouth, her eyes rolled all around; her mind was mindless now. Held by the god, she paid the man no heed. She grabbed his left arm just below the elbow: wedging her foot against the victim’s ribs she ripped his shoulder off – not by mere force; the god made easy everything they touch. On his right arm worked Ino, ripping flesh; Autonoë and the mob of maenads griped him, screaming as one. While he had breath, he cried, but they were whooping victory calls. One took an arm, a foot another, boot and all. They stripped his torso bare, staining their nails with blood, then tossed balls of flesh around. Pentheus’ body lies in fragments now: on the hard rocks, and mingled with the leaves buried in the woodland, hard to find. His mother stumbled across his head: poor head! She grabbed it, and fixed it on her thrysus, like a lions's, to wave in joyful triumph at her hunt.”

The madness passes. Dionysus arrives in his true, divine form, banishes Agave and her sisters, and transforms Cadmus and his wife Harmonia into serpents. Only Tiresias is spared.

In the Iliad, when King Lycurgus of Thrace heard that Dionysus was in his kingdom, he imprisoned Dionysus' followers, the Maenads. Dionysus fled and took refuge with Thetis, and sent a drought which stirred the people to revolt. The god then drove King Lycurgus insane and had him slice his own son into pieces with an axe in the belief that he was a patch of ivy, a plant holy to Dionysus. An oracle then claimed that the land would stay dry and barren as long as Lycurgus lived, and his people had him drawn and quartered. Appeased by the king's death, Dionysus lifted the curse. In an alternative version, sometimes depicted in art, Lycurgus tries to kill Ambrosia, a follower of Dionysus, who was transformed into a vine that twined around the enraged king and slowly strangled him.

Captivity and escape

The Homeric Hymn 7 to Dionysus recounts how, while he sat on the seashore, some sailors spotted him, believing him a prince. They attempted to kidnap him and sail away to sell him for ransom or into slavery. No rope would bind him. The god turned into a fierce lion and unleashed a bear on board, killing all in his path. Those who jumped ship were mercifully turned into dolphins. The only survivor was the helmsman, Acoetes, who recognized the god and tried to stop his sailors from the start.

In a similar story, Dionysus hired a Tyrrhenian pirate ship to sail from Icaria to Naxos. When he was aboard, they sailed not to Naxos but to Asia, intending to sell him as a slave. This time the god turned the mast and oars into snakes, and filled the vessel with ivy and the sound of flutes so that the sailors went mad and, leaping into the sea, were turned into dolphins. In Ovid's Metamorphoses, Bacchus begins this story as a young child found by the pirates, but transforms to a divine adult when on board.

Many of the myths involve Dionysus defending his godhead against skeptics. Malcolm Bull notes that "It is a measure of Bacchus's ambiguous position in classical mythology that he, unlike the other Olympians, had to use a boat to travel to and from the islands with which he is associated". Paola Corrente notes that in many sources, the incident with the pirates happens towards the end of Dionysus' time among mortals. In that sense, it serves as final proof of his divinity, and is often followed by his descent into Hades to retrieve his mother, both of whom can then ascend into heaven to live alongside the other Olympian gods.

Descent to the underworld

Pausanias, in book II of his Description of Greece, describes two variant traditions regarding Dionysus' katabasis, or descent into the underworld. Both describe how Dionysus entered into the afterlife to rescue his mother Semele, and bring her to her rightful place on Olympus. To do so, he had to contend with the hell dog Cerberus, which was restrained for him by Heracles. After retrieving Semele, Dionysus emerged with her from the unfathomable waters of a lagoon on the coast of the Argolid near the prehistoric site of Lerna, according to the local tradition. This mythic event was commemorated with a yearly nighttime festival, the details of which were held secret by the local religion. According to Paola Corrente, the emergence of Dionysus from the waters of the lagoon may signify a form of rebirth for both him and Semele as they reemerged from the underworld. A variant of this myth forms the basis of Aristophanes' comedy The Frogs.

According to the Christian writer Clement of Alexandria, Dionysus was guided in his journey by Prosymnus or Polymnus, who requested, as his reward, to be Dionysus' lover. Prosymnus died before Dionysus could honor his pledge, so to satisfy Prosymnus' shade, Dionysus fashioned a phallus from a fig branch and penetrated himself with it at Prosymnus' tomb. This story survives in full only in Christian sources, whose aim was to discredit pagan mythology, but it appears to have also served to explain the origin of secret objects used by the Dionysian Mysteries.

This same myth of Dionysus' descent to the underworld is related by both Diodorus Siculus in his first century BC work Bibliotheca historica, and Pseudo-Apollodorus in the third book of his first century AD work Bibliotheca. In the latter, Apollodorus tells how after having been hidden away from Hera's wrath, Dionysus traveled the world opposing those who denied his godhood, finally proving it when he transformed his pirate captors into dolphins. After this, the culmination of his life on earth was his descent to retrieve his mother from the underworld. He renamed his mother Thyone, and ascended with her to heaven, where she became a goddess. In this variant of the myth, it is implied that Dionysus both must prove his godhood to mortals, then also legitimize his place on Olympus by proving his lineage and elevating his mother to divine status, before taking his place among the Olympic gods.

Secondary myths

Midas' golden touch

Dionysus discovered that his old school master and foster father, Silenus, had gone missing. The old man had wandered away drunk, and was found by some peasants who carried him to their king Midas (alternatively, he passed out in Midas' rose garden). The king recognized him hospitably, feasting him for ten days and nights while Silenus entertained with stories and songs. On the eleventh day, Midas brought Silenus back to Dionysus. Dionysus offered the king his choice of reward.

Midas asked that whatever he might touch would turn to gold. Dionysus consented, though was sorry that he had not made a better choice. Midas rejoiced in his new power, which he hastened to put to the test. He touched and turned to gold an oak twig and a stone, but his joy vanished when he found that his bread, meat, and wine also turned to gold. Later, when his daughter embraced him, she too turned to gold.

The horrified king strove to divest the Midas Touch, and he prayed to Dionysus to save him from starvation. The god consented, telling Midas to wash in the river Pactolus. As he did so, the power passed into them, and the river sands turned gold: this etiological myth explained the gold sands of the Pactolus.

Love affairs 

When Theseus abandoned Ariadne sleeping on Naxos, Dionysus found and married her. She bore him a son named Oenopion, but she committed suicide or was killed by Perseus. In some variants, Dionysus had her crown put into the heavens as the constellation Corona; in others, he descended into Hades to restore her to the gods on Olympus. Another account claims Dionysus ordered Theseus to abandon Ariadne on the island of Naxos, for Dionysus had seen her as Theseus carried her onto the ship and had decided to marry her. Psalacantha, a nymph, promised to help Dionysus court Ariadne in exchange for his sexual favours; but Dionysus refused, so Psalacantha advised Ariadne against going with him. For this Dionysus turned her into the plant with the same name.

Dionysus fell in love with a nymph named Nicaea, in some versions by Eros' binding. Nicaea however was a sworn virgin and scorned his attempts to court her. So one day, while she was away, he replaced the water in the spring she used to drink from with wine. Intoxicated, Nicaea passed out, and Dionysus raped her in her sleep. When she woke up and realized what had happened, she sought him out in order to harm him, but she never found him. She bore him Telete, Satyrus, and other sons. Dionysus named the ancient city of Nicaea after her.

In Nonnus's Dionysiaca, Eros made Dionysus fall in love with Aura, a virgin companion of Artemis, as part of a ploy to punish Aura for having insulted Artemis. Dionysus used the same trick as with Nicaea to get her fall asleep, tied her up, and then raped her. Aura tried to kill herself, with little success. When she gave birth to twins sons by Dionysus, Iacchus and another boy, she ate one twin before drowning herself in the Sangarius river.

Also in the Dionysiaca, Nonnus relates how Dionysus fell in love with a handsome satyr named Ampelos, who was killed by Selene due to him challenging her. On his death, Dionysus changed him into the first grape-vine.

Other myths

A third descent by Dionysus to Hades is invented by Aristophanes in his comedy The Frogs. Dionysus, as patron of the Athenian dramatic festival, the Dionysia, wants to bring back to life one of the great tragedians. After a poetry slam, Aeschylus is chosen in preference to Euripides.

When Hephaestus bound Hera to a magical chair, Dionysus got him drunk and brought him back to Olympus after he passed out.

Callirrhoe was a Calydonian woman who scorned Coresus, a priest of Dionysus, who threatened to afflict all the women of Calydon with insanity (see Maenad). The priest was ordered to sacrifice Callirhoe but he killed himself instead. Callirhoe threw herself into a well which was later named after her.

Dionysus also sent a fox that was fated never to be caught on Thebes. Creon, king of Thebes, sent Amphitryon to catch and kill the fox. Amphitryon obtained from Cephalus the dog that his wife Procris had received from Minos, which was fated to catch whatever it pursued.

Another account about Dionysus's parentage indicates that he is the son of Zeus and Gê (Gaia), also named Themelê (foundation), corrupted into Semele.

Hyginus relates that Dionysus once gave human speech to a donkey. The donkey then proceeded to challenge Priapus in a contest about which between them had the better penis; the donkey lost. Priapus killed the donkey, but Dionysus placed him among the stars, above the Crab.

Children

Iconography and depictions

Symbols

The earliest cult images of Dionysus show a mature male, bearded and robed. He holds a fennel staff, tipped with a pine-cone and known as a thyrsus. Later images show him as a beardless, sensuous, naked or half-naked androgynous youth: the literature describes him as womanly or "man-womanish". In its fully developed form, his central cult imagery shows his triumphant, disorderly arrival or return, as if from some place beyond the borders of the known and civilized. His procession (thiasus) is made up of wild female followers (maenads) and bearded satyrs with erect penises; some are armed with the thyrsus, some dance or play music. The god himself is drawn in a chariot, usually by exotic beasts such as lions or tigers, and is sometimes attended by a bearded, drunken Silenus. This procession is presumed to be the cult model for the followers of his Dionysian Mysteries. Dionysus is represented by city religions as the protector of those who do not belong to conventional society and he thus symbolizes the chaotic, dangerous and unexpected, everything which escapes human reason and which can only be attributed to the unforeseeable action of the gods.

Dionysus was a god of resurrection and he was strongly linked to the bull. In a cult hymn from Olympia, at a festival for Hera, Dionysus is invited to come as a bull; "with bull-foot raging". Walter Burkert relates, "Quite frequently [Dionysus] is portrayed with bull horns, and in Kyzikos he has a tauromorphic image", and refers also to an archaic myth in which Dionysus is slaughtered as a bull calf and impiously eaten by the Titans.

The snake and phallus were symbols of Dionysus in ancient Greece, and of Bacchus in Greece and Rome. He typically wears a panther or leopard skin and carries a thyrsus. His iconography sometimes includes maenads, who wear wreaths of ivy and serpents around their hair or neck.

Peters suggests the original meaning as "he who runs among the trees", or that of a "runner in the woods". Janda (2010) accepts the etymology but proposes the more cosmological interpretation of "he who impels the (world-)tree". This interpretation explains how Nysa could have been re-interpreted from a meaning of "tree" to the name of a mountain: the axis mundi of Indo-European mythology is represented both as a world-tree and as a world-mountain.

Dionysus is also closely associated with the transition between summer and autumn. In the Mediterranean summer, marked by the rising of the dog star Sirius, the weather becomes extremely hot, but it is also a time when the promise of coming harvests grow. Late summer, when Orion is at the center of the sky, was the time of the grape harvest in ancient Greece. Plato describes the gifts of this season as the fruit that is harvested as well as Dionysian joy. Pindar describes the "pure light of high summer" as closely associated with Dionysus and possibly even an embodiment of the god himself. An image of Dionysus' birth from Zeus' thigh call him "the light of Zeus" (Dios phos) and associate him with the light of Sirius.

Classical art 

The god, and still more often his followers, were commonly depicted in the painted pottery of Ancient Greece, much of which made to hold wine. But, apart from some reliefs of maenads, Dionysian subjects rarely appeared in large sculpture before the Hellenistic period, when they became common. In these, the treatment of the god himself ranged from severe archaising or Neo Attic types such as the Dionysus Sardanapalus to types showing him as an indolent and androgynous young man, often nude. Hermes and the Infant Dionysus is probably a Greek original in marble, and the Ludovisi Dionysus group is probably a Roman original of the second century AD. Well-known Hellenistic sculptures of Dionysian subjects, surviving in Roman copies, include the Barberini Faun, the Belvedere Torso, the Resting Satyr. The Furietti Centaurs and Sleeping Hermaphroditus reflect related subjects, which had by this time become drawn into the Dionysian orbit. The marble Dancer of Pergamon is an original, as is the bronze Dancing Satyr of Mazara del Vallo, a recent recovery from the sea.

The Dionysian world by the Hellenistic period is a hedonistic but safe pastoral into which other semi-divine creatures of the countryside have been co-opted, such as centaurs, nymphs, and the gods Pan and Hermaphrodite. "Nymph" by this stage "means simply an ideal female of the Dionysian outdoors, a non-wild bacchant". Hellenistic sculpture also includes for the first time large genre subjects of children and peasants, many of whom carry Dionysian attributes such as ivy wreaths, and "most should be seen as part of his realm. They have in common with satyrs and nymphs that they are creatures of the outdoors and are without true personal identity." The fourth-century BC Derveni Krater, the unique survival of a very large scale Classical or Hellenistic metal vessel of top quality, depicts Dionysus and his followers.

Dionysus appealed to the Hellenistic monarchies for a number of reasons, apart from merely being a god of pleasure: He was a human who became divine, he came from, and had conquered, the East, exemplified a lifestyle of display and magnificence with his mortal followers, and was often regarded as an ancestor. He continued to appeal to the rich of Imperial Rome, who populated their gardens with Dionysian sculpture, and by the second century AD were often buried in sarcophagi carved with crowded scenes of Bacchus and his entourage.

The fourth-century AD Lycurgus Cup in the British Museum is a spectacular cage cup which changes colour when light comes through the glass; it shows the bound King Lycurgus being taunted by the god and attacked by a satyr; this may have been used for celebration of Dionysian mysteries. Elizabeth Kessler has theorized that a mosaic appearing on the triclinium floor of the House of Aion in Nea Paphos, Cyprus, details a monotheistic worship of Dionysus. In the mosaic, other gods appear but may only be lesser representations of the centrally imposed Dionysus. The mid-Byzantine Veroli Casket shows the tradition lingering in Constantinople around 1000 AD, but probably not very well understood.

Early modern art

Bacchic subjects in art resumed in the Italian Renaissance, and soon became almost as popular as in antiquity, but his "strong association with feminine spirituality and power almost disappeared", as did "the idea that the destructive and creative powers of the god were indissolubly linked". In Michelangelo's statue (1496–97) "madness has become merriment". The statue tries to suggest both drunken incapacity and an elevated consciousness, but this was perhaps lost on later viewers, and typically the two aspects were thereafter split, with a clearly drunk Silenus representing the former, and a youthful Bacchus often shown with wings, because he carries the mind to higher places.

Titian's Bacchus and Ariadne (1522–23) and The Bacchanal of the Andrians (1523–26), both painted for the same room, offer an influential heroic pastoral, while Diego Velázquez in The Triumph of Bacchus (or Los borrachos – "the drinkers", c. 1629) and Jusepe de Ribera in his Drunken Silenus choose a genre realism. Flemish Baroque painting frequently painted the Bacchic followers, as in Van Dyck's Drunken Silenus and many works by Rubens; Poussin was another regular painter of Bacchic scenes.

A common theme in art beginning in the sixteenth century was the depiction of Bacchus and Ceres caring for a representation of love – often Venus, Cupid, or Amore. This tradition derived from a quotation by the Roman comedian Terence (c. 195/185 – c. 159 BC) which became a popular proverb in the Early Modern period: Sine Cerere et Baccho friget Venus ("without Ceres and Bacchus, Venus freezes"). Its simplest level of meaning is that love needs food and wine to thrive. Artwork based on this saying was popular during the period 1550–1630, especially in Northern Mannerism in Prague and the Low Countries, as well as by Rubens. Because of his association with the vine harvest, Bacchus became the god of autumn, and he and his followers were often shown in sets depicting the seasons.

Modern literature and philosophy

Dionysus has remained an inspiration to artists, philosophers and writers into the modern era. In The Birth of Tragedy (1872), the German philosopher Friedrich Nietzsche proposed that a tension between Apollonian and Dionysian aesthetic principles underlay the development of Greek tragedy; Dionysus represented what was unrestrained chaotic and irrational, while Apollo represented the rational and ordered. This concept of a rivalry or opposition between Dionysus and Apollo has been characterized as a "modern myth", as it is the invention of modern thinkers like Nietzsche and Johann Joachim Winckelmann, and is not found in classical sources. However, the acceptance and popularity of this theme in Western culture has been so great, that its undercurrent has influenced the conclusions of classical scholarship.

Nietzsche also claimed that the oldest forms of Greek Tragedy were entirely based upon the suffering Dionysus. In Nietzsche's 1886 work Beyond Good and Evil, and later The Twilight of the Idols, The Antichrist and Ecce Homo, Dionysus is conceived as the embodiment of the unrestrained will to power. In The Hellenic Religion of the Suffering God (1904), and Dionysus and Early Dionysianism (1921), the poet Vyacheslav Ivanov elaborates the theory of Dionysianism, tracing the origins of literature, and tragedy in particular, to ancient Dionysian mysteries. Ivanov said that Dionysus' suffering "was the distinctive feature of the cult" just as Christ's suffering is significant for Christianity. Karl Kerényi characterizes Dionysus as representative of the psychological life force (Greek Zoê). Other psychological interpretations place Dionysus' emotionality in the foreground, focusing on the joy, terror or hysteria associated with the god. Sigmund Freud specified that his ashes should be kept in an Ancient Greek vase painted with Dionysian scenes from his collection, which remains on display at Golders Green Crematorium in London.

Modern film and performance art
Walt Disney depicted Bacchus in the "Pastoral" segment of the animated film Fantasia, as a Silenus-like character. In 1969, an adaption of The Bacchae was performed, called Dionysus in '69. A film was made of the same performance. The production was notable for involving audience participation, nudity, and theatrical innovations. In 1974, Stephen Sondheim and Burt Shevelove adapted Aristophanes' comedy The Frogs into a modern musical, which hit broadway in 2004 and was revived in London in 2017. The musical keeps the descent of Dionysus into Hades to bring back a playwright; however, the playwrights are updated to modern times, and Dionysus is forced to choose between George Bernard Shaw and William Shakespeare.

In 2006, The Orion Experience, in the album Cosmicandy, included a song titled "Cult of Dionysus". The song invokes themes from the god's cult. The entire album is described as "short, sharp, and ultimately memorable, glowing with a long-forgotten disco-synth energy." The song overall plays upon the god's themes of being devious and rebelling against social norms.

In 2014, Dionysus is featured in Smite as a playable god under his Roman Bacchus name.

In 2018, Dionysus was featured in Hades, an indie rougelike action dungeon crawler video game developed and published by Supergiant Games. He is one of the cousins of the protagonist and playable character, Zagreus, who is trying to escape the underworld and find his mother whilst his father, Hades, tries to stop him. Dionysus offers boons and assist the Son of Hades in his attempts to escape from the underworld. All of his boons and powers are based on his key traits from his Mythos, focusing on alcohol related abilities and negative effects on enemies to assist the protagonist. His characterisation in the game nods back to a lot of his stories and traits from the history of the character. His interactions with other Gods also highlight his character as mischievous, a lover of festivities and of course, wine. There is also the reference of the protagonist having the name Zagreus, considered to be the first birth of Dionysus. He is voiced by Cyrus Nemati.

In 2018, the Australian musical project Dead Can Dance released an album entitled Dionysus. Musician Brendan Perry described the inspiration for the album as a trance-like, "Dionysian" experience he had at a festival during a trip to rural Spain. "It's the spring festivals like that one where you see the real remnants of Dionysian festivals. They're all over the Mediterranean in remote places where Christian influence hasn't been as great. ... People wear masks and dance in circles almost like time has stood still in their celebrations." Perry chose to employ Mediterranean folk instruments that mimic natural sounds in addition to a vocal chorus, in order to evoke the atmosphere of an ancient festival.

In 2019, the South Korean boy band BTS released a rap-rock-synth-pop-hip hop track. named "Dionysus" as part of their album Map of the Soul: Persona. The naming of this song comes from the association of the namesake with debauchery and excess, this is reflected in its lyrics talking about "getting drunk on art" – playing on the Korean words for "alcohol" (술 sul) and "art" (예술 yesul) as an example – alongside expressions about their stardom, legacy, and artistic integrity. The band's leader RM in a press release described the song as, "the joy and pain of creating something" and "an honest track".

Parallels with Christianity

Numerous scholars have compared narratives surrounding the Christian figure of Jesus with those associated with Dionysus.

Death and resurrection
Some scholars of comparative mythology identify both Dionysus and Jesus with the dying-and-rising god mythological archetype. On the other hand, it has been noted that the details of Dionysus' death and rebirth are starkly different both in content and symbolism from Jesus. The two stories take place in very different historical and geographic contexts. Also, the manner of death is different; in the most common myth, Dionysus was torn to pieces and eaten by the Titans, but "eventually restored to a new life" from the heart that was left over.

Trial
Another parallel can be seen in The Bacchae where Dionysus appears before King Pentheus on charges of claiming divinity, which is compared to the New Testament scene of Jesus being interrogated by Pontius Pilate. However, a number of scholars dispute this parallel, since the confrontation between Dionysus and Pentheus ends with Pentheus dying, torn into pieces by the mad women, whereas the trial of Jesus ends with him being sentenced to death. The discrepancies between the two stories, including their resolutions, have led many scholars to regard the Dionysus story as radically different from the one about Jesus, except for the parallel of the arrest, which is a detail that appears in many biographies as well.

Other parallels
E. Kessler has argued that the Dionysian cult developed into strict monotheism by the fourth century AD; together with Mithraism and other sects, the cult formed an instance of "pagan monotheism" in direct competition with Early Christianity during Late Antiquity. Scholars from the sixteenth century onwards, especially Gerard Vossius, also discussed the parallels between the biographies of Dionysus/Bacchus and Moses (Vossius named his sons Dionysius and Isaac). Such comparisons surface in details of paintings by Poussin.

John Moles has argued that the Dionysian cult influenced early Christianity, and especially the way that Christians understood themselves as a new religion centered around a savior deity. In particular, he argues that the account of Christian origins in the Acts of the Apostles was heavily influenced by Euripides' The Bacchae. Moles also suggests that Paul the Apostle may have partially based his account of the Lord's Supper on the ritual meals performed by members of the Dionysian cult.

Gallery

Genealogy

See also

 Alpos and Nonnus
 Anthesteria, Ascolia, Dionysia and Lenaia
 Dionysian Mysteries and Cult of Dionysus
 Pan (god), Ampelos, Cybele and Silenus
 Theatre of Dionysus

Notes

References

 Aristides, Aristides ex recensione Guilielmi Dindorfii, Volume 3, Wilhelm Dindorf, Weidmann, G. Reimer, 1829. Hathi Trust Digital Library.
 Aristophanes, Frogs, Matthew Dillon, Ed., Perseus Digital Library, Tufts University, 1995. Online version at the Perseus Digital Library.
 Arnobius of Sicca, The Seven Books of Arnobius Adversus Gentes, translated by Archibald Hamilton Bryce and Hugh Campbell, Edinburg: T. & T. Clark. 1871. Internet Archive.
 Arrian, Anabasis of Alexander, Volume I: Books 1–4, translated by P. A. Brunt. Loeb Classical Library No. 236. Cambridge, Massachusetts: Harvard University Press, 1976. . Online version at Harvard University Press.
 Arrian, Anabasis of Alexander, Volume II: Books 5–7, translated by P. A. Brunt. Loeb Classical Library No. 269. Cambridge, Massachusetts: Harvard University Press, 1976. . Online version at Harvard University Press.
 
 Bowie, A. M., Aristophanes: Myth, Ritual and Comedy, Cambridge University Press, 1993. .
 Bowie, E. L., "Time and Place, Narrative and Speech in Philicus, Philodams and Limenius" in Hymnic Narrative and the Narratology of Greek Hymns, edited by Andrew Faulkner, Owen Hodkinson, Brill, 2015. .
 Bull, Malcolm, The Mirror of the Gods, How Renaissance Artists Rediscovered the Pagan Gods, Oxford UP, 2005, 
 Burkert, Walter, Greek Religion, Harvard University Press, 1985. .
 Clement of Alexandria, The Exhortation to the Greeks. The Rich Man's Salvation. To the Newly Baptized. Translated by G. W. Butterworth. Loeb Classical Library No. 92. Cambridge, Massachusetts: Harvard University Press, 1919. . Online version at Harvard University Press. Internet Archive 1960 edition.
 Collard, Christopher and Martin Cropp, Euripides Fragments: Oedipus-Chrysippus: Other Fragments, Loeb Classical Library No. 506. Cambridge, Massachusetts: Harvard University Press, 2008. . Online version at Harvard University Press.
 
 Diodorus Siculus, Diodorus Siculus: The Library of History. Translated by C. H. Oldfather. Twelve volumes. Loeb Classical Library. Cambridge, Massachusetts: Harvard University Press; London: William Heinemann, Ltd. 1989. Online version by Bill Thayer
 Edmonds, Radcliffe (1999), "Tearing Apart the Zagreus Myth: A Few Disparaging Remarks On Orphism and Original Sin", Classical Antiquity 18 (1999): 35–73. PDF.
 Encinas Reguero, M. Carmen, "The Names of Dionysos in Euripides’ Bacchae and the Rhetorical Language of Teiresias", in Redefining Dionysos, Editors: Alberto Bernabé, Miguel Herrero de Jáuregui, Ana Isabel Jiménez San Cristóbal, Raquel Martín Hernández. Walter de Gruyter, 2013. .
 Euripides, Bacchae, translated by T. A. Buckley in The Tragedies of Euripides, London. Henry G. Bohn. 1850. Online version at the Perseus Digital Library.
 Euripides, Cyclops, in Euripides, with an English translation by David Kovacs, Cambridge. Harvard University Press. forthcoming. Online version at the Perseus Digital Library.
 Euripides, Ion, translated by Robert Potter in The Complete Greek Drama, edited by Whitney J. Oates and Eugene O'Neill, Jr. Volume 1. New York. Random House. 1938. Online version at the Perseus Digital Library.
 Euripides, The Trojan Women, in The Plays of Euripides, translated by E. P. Coleridge. Volume I. London. George Bell and Sons. 1891. Online version at the Perseus Digital Library.
 Fantuzzi, Marco, "Sung Poetry: The Case of Inscribed Paeans" in A Companion to Hellenistic Literature, editors: James J. Clauss, Martine Cuypers, John Wiley & Sons, 2010. .
 Farnell, Lewis Richard, The Cults of the Greek States vol 5, Clarendon Press, Oxford, 1909 Internet Archive; cf. Chapter IV, "Cults of Dionysos"; Chapter V, "Dionysiac Ritual"; Chapter VI, "Cult-Monuments of Dionysos"; Chapter VII, "Ideal Dionysiac Types".
 Fowler, R. L. (2013), Early Greek Mythography: Volume 2: Commentary, Oxford University Press, 2013. .
 Lightfoot, J. L. Hellenistic Collection: Philitas. Alexander of Aetolia. Hermesianax. Euphorion. Parthenius. Edited and translated by J. L. Lightfoot. Loeb Classical Library No. 508. Cambridge, Massachusetts: Harvard University Press, 2010. . Online version at Harvard University Press.
 Fox, William Sherwood, The Mythology of All Races, v. 1, Greek and Roman, 1916, General editor, Louis Herbert Gray.
 Gantz, Timothy, Early Greek Myth: A Guide to Literary and Artistic Sources, Johns Hopkins University Press, 1996, Two volumes:  (Vol. 1),  (Vol. 2).
 Graf, F. (1974), Eleusis und die orphische Dichtung Athens in vorhellenistischer Zeit, Walter de Gruyter, 1974. .
 Graf, F. (2005), "Iacchus" in Brill's New Pauly: Encyclopaedia of the Ancient World. Antiquity, Volume 6, Lieden-Boston 2005.
 Grimal, Pierre, The Dictionary of Classical Mythology, Wiley-Blackwell, 1996, .
 Guthrie, W. K. C., Orpheus and Greek Religion: A Study of the Orphic Movement, Princeton University Press, 1935. .
 Hard, Robin, The Routledge Handbook of Greek Mythology: Based on H.J. Rose's "Handbook of Greek Mythology", Psychology Press, 2004, .
 Harder, Annette, Callimachus: Aetia: Introduction, Text, Translation and Commentary, Oxford University Press, 2012. . (two volume set). Google Books
 Harrison, Jane Ellen, Prolegomena to the Study of Greek Religion, second edition, Cambridge: Cambridge University Press, 1908. Internet Archive
 Herodotus; Histories, A. D. Godley (translator), Cambridge: Harvard University Press, 1920; . Online version at the Perseus Digital Library.
 Hesiod, Theogony, in The Homeric Hymns and Homerica with an English Translation by Hugh G. Evelyn-White, Cambridge, MA, Harvard University Press; London, William Heinemann Ltd. 1914. Online version at the Perseus Digital Library.
 Homer, The Iliad with an English Translation by A.T. Murray, PhD in two volumes. Cambridge, Massachusetts., Harvard University Press; London, William Heinemann, Ltd. 1924. Online version at the Perseus Digital Library.
 Homer; The Odyssey with an English Translation by A.T. Murray, PH.D. in two volumes. Cambridge, Massachusetts., Harvard University Press; London, William Heinemann, Ltd. 1919. Online version at the Perseus Digital Library.
 Hyginus, Gaius Julius, Fabulae in Apollodorus' Library and Hyginus' Fabulae: Two Handbooks of Greek Mythology, Translated, with Introductions by R. Scott Smith and Stephen M. Trzaskoma, Hackett Publishing Company, 2007. .
 Janda, Michael, Die Musik nach dem Chaos, Innsbruck 2010.
 Jameson, Michael. "The Asexuality of Dionysus." Masks of Dionysus. Ed. Thomas H. Carpenter and Christopher A. Faraone. Ithaca: Cornell UP, 1993. . 44–64.
 Jiménez San Cristóbal, Anna Isabel, 2012, "Iacchus in Plutarch" in Plutarch in the Religious and Philosophical Discourse of Late Antiquity, edited by Fernando Lautaro Roig Lanzillotta and Israel Mu Oz Gallarte, Brill, .
 Jiménez San Cristóbal, Anna Isabel 2013, "The Sophoclean Dionysos" in Redefining Dionysus, Editors: Alberto Bernabé, Miguel Herrero de Jáuregui, Ana Isabel Jiménez San Cristóbal, Raquel Martín Hernández, Walter de Gruyter. .
 Kerényi, Karl 1967, Eleusis: Archetypal Image of Mother and Daughter, Princeton University Press, 1991. .
 Kerényi, Karl 1976, Dionysos: Archetypal Image of Indestructible Life, Princeton University Press, 1996. .
 Linforth, Ivan M., The Arts of Orpheus, Berkeley, University of California Press, 1941. Online version at HathiTrust
 Lloyd-Jones, Hugh, Sophocles: Fragments, Edited and translated by Hugh Lloyd-Jones, Loeb Classical Library No. 483. Cambridge, Massachusetts: Harvard University Press, 1996. . Online version at Harvard University Press.
 Kern, Otto. Orphicorum Fragmenta, Berlin, 1922. Internet Archive
 Lucretius, De Rerum Natura, William Ellery Leonard. E. P. Dutton. 1916. Online version at the Perseus Digital Library.
 Marcovich, Miroslav, Studies in Graeco-Roman Religions and Gnosticism, Brill, 1988. .
 March, Jenny, Cassell's Dictionary of Classical Mythology, Casell & Co, 2001. . Internet Archive
 
 Nauck, Johann August, Tragicorum graecorum fragmenta, Leipzig, Teubner, 1989. Internet Archive
 Nilsson, Martin, P., "Early Orphism and Kindred Religions Movements", The Harvard Theological Review, Vol. 28, No. 3 (Jul., 1935), pp. 181–230. 
 Nonnus, Dionysiaca; translated by Rouse, W H D, I Books I–XV. Loeb Classical Library No. 344, Cambridge, Massachusetts, Harvard University Press; London, William Heinemann Ltd. 1940. Internet Archive
 Nonnus, Dionysiaca; translated by Rouse, W H D, III Books XXXVI–XLVIII. Loeb Classical Library No. 346, Cambridge, Massachusetts, Harvard University Press; London, William Heinemann Ltd. 1940. Internet Archive.
 Ogden, Daniel, Drakōn: Dragon Myth and Serpent Cult in the Greek and Roman Worlds, Oxford University Press, 2013. .
 Ovid, Metamorphoses, Brookes More. Boston. Cornhill Publishing Co. 1922. Online version at the Perseus Digital Library.
 Parker, Robert (2002), "Early Orphism" in The Greek World, edited by Anton Powell, Routledge, 2002. .
 Parker, Robert (2005) Polytheism and Society at Athens, OUP Oxford, 2005. .
 Pausanias, Pausanias Description of Greece with an English Translation by W.H.S. Jones, Litt.D., and H.A. Ormerod, M.A., in 4 Volumes. Cambridge, Massachusetts, Harvard University Press; London, William Heinemann Ltd. 1918. Online version at the Perseus Digital Library.
 Sara Peterson, An account of the Dionysiac presence in Indian art and culture. Academia.edu, 2016
 Pickard-Cambridge, Arthur, The Theatre of Dionysus at Athens, 1946.
 Plutarch, Moralia, Volume V: Isis and Osiris. The E at Delphi. The Oracles at Delphi No Longer Given in Verse. The Obsolescence of Oracles. Translated by Frank Cole Babbitt. Loeb Classical Library No. 306. Cambridge, Massachusetts: Harvard University Press, 1936. . Online version at Harvard University Press.
 Powell, Barry B., Classical Myth, 5th edition, 2007.
 Pseudo-Plutarch, De fluviis, in Plutarch's morals, Volume V, edited and translated by William Watson Goodwin, Boston: Little, Brown & Co., 1874. Online version at the Perseus Digital Library.
 Ridgeway, William, Origin of Tragedy, 1910. Kessinger Publishing (June 2003). .
 Ridgeway, William, The Dramas and Dramatic Dances of non-European Races in special reference to the origin of Greek Tragedy, with an appendix on the origin of Greek Comedy, 1915.
 Riu, Xavier, Dionysism and Comedy, Rowman and Littlefield Publishers (1999). .
 Rose, Herbert Jennings, "Iacchus" in The Oxford Classical Dictionary, second edition, Hammond, N.G.L. and Howard Hayes Scullard (editors), Oxford University Press, 1992. .
 Rutherford, Ian, (2016) Greco-Egyptian Interactions: Literature, Translation, and Culture, 500 BC–AD 300, Oxford University Press, 2016. .
 Rutherford, William G., (1896) Scholia Aristphanica, London, Macmillan and Co. and New York, 1896. Internet Archive*Seaford, Richard. "Dionysos", Routledge (2006). .
 Smith, R.R.R., Hellenistic Sculpture, a handbook, Thames & Hudson, 1991, 
 Smith, William; Dictionary of Greek and Roman Biography and Mythology, London (1873). Online version at the Perseus Digital Library
 Smyth, Herbert Weir, Aeschylus, with an English translation by Herbert Weir Smyth, Volume II, London: Heinemann, 1926. Internet Archive
 Sommerstein, Alan H., Aeschylus: Fragments. Edited and translated by Alan H. Sommerstein. Loeb Classical Library No. 505. Cambridge, Massachusetts: Harvard University Press, 2009. . Online version at Harvard University Press.
 Sophocles, The Antigone of Sophocles, Edited with introduction and notes by Sir Richard Jebb, Sir Richard Jebb. Cambridge. Cambridge University Press. 1891. Online version at the Perseus Digital Library
 Strabo, Geography, translated by Horace Leonard Jones; Cambridge, Massachusetts: Harvard University Press; London: William Heinemann, Ltd. (1924). Books 6–14, at the Perseus Digital Library
 Sutton, Dana F., Ancient Comedy, Twayne Publishers (August 1993). .
 Tripp, Edward, Crowell's Handbook of Classical Mythology, Thomas Y. Crowell Co; First edition (June 1970). .
 Versnel, H. S., "ΙΑΚΧΟΣ. Some Remarks Suggested by an Unpublished Lekythos in the Villa Giulia", Talanta 4, 1972, 23–38. PDF
 West, M. L. (1983), The Orphic Poems, Clarendon Press. .

Further reading

 Livy, History of Rome, Book 39:13, Description of banned Bacchanalia in Rome and Italy
 Detienne, Marcel, Dionysos at Large, tr. by Arthur Goldhammer, Harvard University Press, 1989. . (Originally in French as Dionysos à ciel ouvert, 1986)
 Albert Henrichs, Between City and Country: Cultic Dimensions of Dionysus in Athens and Attica, (April 1, 1990). Department of Classics, UCB. Cabinet of the Muses: Rosenmeyer Festschrift. Paper festschrift18.
 Sara Peterson, An account of the Dionysiac presence in Indian art and culture. Academia, 2016
 Frazer, James "The Golden Bough"
 Kern, O. Dionysos (2) in Paulys Realencyclopädie der classischen Altertumswissenschaft, tr. into English
 Walter F. Otto "Dionysus: Myth and Cult"
 Redifining Dionysos, a large collaborative academic study on Dionysus and his worship in antiquity.
 Richard Seaford, Routledge "Dionysos"
 Henk Versnel "Heis Dionysus - One Dionysus? A polytheistic perspective" an examination of Greek religion and Dionysos himself.

External links

 
 
 Theoi Project, Dionysos myths from original sources, cult, classical art
 Ca 2000 images of Bacchus at the Warburg Institute's Iconographic Database 
 Iconographic Themes in Art: Bacchus |Dionysos 
 Treatise on the Bacchic Mysteries
 Ancient texts on Dionysus, from Tiresias: The Ancient Mediterranean Religions Source Database

 
Chthonic beings
Dacian gods
Greek gods
History of wine
Fertility gods
Life-death-rebirth gods
Agricultural gods
Deities of wine and beer
Consorts of Aphrodite
Homosexuality and bisexuality deities
LGBT themes in Greek mythology
Mythology of Heracles
Harvest gods
Music and singing gods
Arts gods
Mythological rapists
Deeds of Hera
Deeds of Hermes
Metamorphoses characters
Deities in the Iliad
Children of Zeus
Shapeshifters in Greek mythology
Cattle deities